The Football Kenya Federation (abbreviated as Football Kenya or FKF) is the governing body of football in Kenya. The FKF organizes the Kenyan Premier League, the Kenyan Women's Premier League, FKF Division One, FKF Women Division One and Kenya national football teams. It is headed by Nick Mwendwa.

History
The Federation was founded in 1960 as a FIFA affiliation, in 1961 it was a CAF affiliation, and later it was a CECAFA affiliation in 1973.

On November 2011, Football Kenya Limited (FKL) was disbanded as it wanted to cease being a limited company. The Football Kenya Federation (FKF) replaced FKL, but most of the new executive positions were retained by their former occupants on FKL.

FKF 

FKF was headed by Sam Nyamweya between 2011 and 2015. During this time Nyamweya was heavily linked to embezzlement of federation funds. This period of Kenyan football has been seen by the Kenyan public as a dark time with money often unavailable for use by the national team, this extended into international based players such as Victor Wanyama often having to pay for their own flights to and from international matches

In February 2016 Nick Mwendwa who ran as part of the "Team Change" took over from Nyamweya Mwendwa's plans include the changing of the KPL format to an 18 team league and re-open the long closed FIFA goal project office at the Moi International Sports Centre.

In April 2016, The ladies national team, the Harambee Starlets qualified for their first-ever AFCON set to be hosted in Cameroon in 2016.

In June 2016, FKF moved its offices to FIFA goal project at Kasarani stadium.

FKF and betting company SportPesa signed a 5-year partnership in June 2016

Suspension 
On November 2022, FIFA lifted the suspension against the Kenya Football Federation (FKF), following the local government's decision to reinstate the body after disbanding it over suspicions of corruption.

References

External links
 
 Constitution of the Football Kenya Federation
 Kenya at the CAF website
 Kenya at the FIFA website

Kenya
 
Football